Uni-versal Extras is a casting agency designed to help people find part-time work by supplying them as extras (or supporting artists) in TV and film productions across the UK and Ireland.

History 
Uni-versal Extras Ltd. was founded in 2005 by 23-year-old Oxford Brookes graduate Wayne Berko. After researching the market, Berko realized that feature film and TV productions shooting in multiple locations across the UK would benefit from having one nationwide casting agency. Funding was obtained by investing his own savings and by applying for DTI loans. DTI loans are borrowed directly from a bank which are guaranteed (up to a point) by the Department of Trade and Industry.

Uni-versal Extras set out to provide a free service to all students over the age of 16, offering the opportunity of well paid part-time work in the TV and film industries. Berko became an ambassador for a government backed program called "Make Your Mark" to help young people harness their entrepreneurial skill, and was also named as one of the Top 15 Young Entrepreneurs in Europe in 2006 by Business Week.

In 2007, the company opened its books to a diverse range of professional sectors such as the emergency services, armed forces and the glamor industry in order to cater to the diverse requirements of production companies. This enabled the company to supply extras and supporting artists of all ages and backgrounds with diverse skills. Uni-versal Extras has since acted as the sole extras agency on a diverse range of award winning productions such as Les Misérables and Tinker Tailor Soldier Spy.

References 

Guardian news piece 'Acting Up' Jan 2009
Follow-up article in Business Week
TnT Magazine 'Careers in Film'

External links 
Uni-versal Extras website
The Make Your Mark Scheme
BECTU - a Union governing the world of SAs (Extras)
EQUITY - a Union governing the world of SAs (Extras)

Companies based in Buckinghamshire
Casting companies